Artifex University of Bucharest is a higher education institution, a legal entity of public utility according to private law and part of the national education system. Headquartered in Bucharest, the university was established as an effect of Act no. 133/2005.

Artifex University of Bucharest operates according to the principle of universities' autonomy – within the legal framework provided by the Romanian Constitution, the National Education Act and its own charter. The founder of Artifex University of Bucharest is the National Technical, Scientific, Social and Cultural Foundation of the Crafting Cooperatives. The autonomy of Artifex University of Bucharest includes the following forms of autonomy: organizational and functional autonomy, teaching and scientific autonomy, financial and administrative autonomy, jurisdictional autonomy.

Background
Artifex University of Bucharest continues a tradition which legally began in the year 1919, when the School of Co-operative Studies was founded under the Act of January 3, with the endorsement of Professors Ion Răducanu and Nicolae Iorga. Towards the end of the same year, the School became the Academy for High Co-operative Studies and it was subsequently re-organized during the inter-war period by the acts that regulated cooperative activities. On September 2, 1946, under the provisions of Act no. 707 and Decree no. 2700, the Academy for Co-operative Studies was established and one year later, under the provisions of Act no. 299/1947, the Academy for Co-operative Studies and the Academy for Commercial and Industrial Studies of Bucharest were re-organized into the Academy of Commercial and Cooperative Studies, which included: the Faculty of Cooperative Studies and the Faculty of Commercial Sciences. Decree no. 175/1948 changed the name of the Academy into the “Institute for Economic Sciences and Planning” of Bucharest. In 1949, the Co-operative Faculty was set up within this institute. In 1967, the economic higher education was re-organized and the name of the institution was changed into the Academy of Economic Studies.

In keeping with the tradition of the Academy for Co-operative Studies and in order to answer the demand for higher-educated professionals, the Council of UCECOM decided to establish the Artifex National Technical, Scientific, Social and Cultural Foundation of the Crafting Cooperatives, by Decision no. 8 of 1992 and according to the legal provisions of the Law-Decree no. 66 of February 8, 1990. (To keep the tradition and preserve continuity, the name “ARTIFEX” comes from Latin and it translates as “craftsman” or “artisan”). The newly founded institution was a legal entity and non-profit organization, according to the Decision of Sector 1 local Court of Bucharest, by civil sentence no. 347 of 27 November 1992. Subsequently, under the Law-Decree no. 66/1990, Act no. 21/1924 and article 8, point 4 of the Foundation Statute, the Managerial Board decided to set up Artifex University.

Present and future
Since its reorganization in 1993-1994 academic year, Artifex University and proposed to conduct a program of training and education to become a scientific and cultural center-the national educational system. The aim is to promote the organized activities and dissemination of the principles and cultural values and scientific connection, the values of the contemporary world. Within this framework, Artifex University acted for the promotion, in its entire business, a critical debate options, pluralism, ensuring the prestige of national culture and developing collaborative international relations.

Training, education and research promoted by the accredited undergraduate programs of bachelor's and master's degrees, organized within the framework of the Artifex University of Bucharest, meet a real social needs to prepare staff and specialists needed leadership and organization of the economic and social sector of the cooperative, of small and medium enterprises, as well as other fields.

Currently, Artifex University operates five programs of study accredited undergraduate degree (Finance and Banking, Accounting and Management Information Systems, Management, Marketing, Economy of Commerce, Tourism and services) and eight undergraduate programmes accredited master's degree (Management for Finance, Banking and Insurance; Finance, Banking and Capital Markets; Informational System Management for Finance and Accounting; Organizational Management; Management of Small and Medium-sized Enterprises; Marketing and Business Communication; Strategic Marketing; Business Administration in Commerce, Tourism and services).

Artifex University, as well as all programs of study what works within it are externally assessed and accredited by the Romanian Agency for quality assurance in higher education. The University was evaluated in 2011 and received the "Confidence" degree.

Structure
The educational offer (the academic programs) of the University focus on the following areas (fields of study): Finance, Accounting, Management, Marketing and Business Administration. Thus, the Artifex University of Bucharest is the only private university that focuses its entire educational offer in the field of economics. Artifex University includes the following faculties and academic programs for both undergraduate and post-graduate studies (which are all accredited and function as full attendance classes):

The Faculty of Finance and Accounting:

Undergraduate academic programs:
Finance and Banking;
Accounting and Management Information Systems.
Post-graduate academic programs:
Management for Finance, Banking and Insurance;
Finance, Banking and Capital Markets;
Informational System Management for Finance and Accounting.

The Faculty of Management – Marketing:

Undergraduate academic programs:
Management;
Marketing;
Economy of Commerce, Tourism and services.

Post-graduate academic programs:
Organizational Management; 
Management of Small and Medium-sized Enterprises; 
Marketing and Business Communication;
Strategic Marketing;
Business Administration in Commerce, Tourism and services.

In the academic year 2013-2014, the operation of the above-mentioned programs are regulated by Decision no. 493/2013 concerning the approval of the Nomenclature of fields and academic programs / specializations, the structure of higher education institutions, the academic fields and programs either accredited or temporarily authorized to operate, the approved geographic locations, the number of transferable credits for each academic program, the form of education and teaching language and the maximum number of students that may be schooled in the academic year 2013-2014, and by Decision no. 581/2013 concerning the accreditation of the study fields for post-graduate academic programs, the curricula and the maximum number of students that may be schooled in the academic year 2013-2014.

Two specialized departments function within Artifex University, i.e. the Department of Finance – Accounting and the Department of Management – Marketing, as well as the University research center, accredited by CNCSIS in 2009. The faculty is the functional academic unit that develops and manages academic programs. It corresponds to one or more fields (domains) of the economic sciences. The department is the functional unit that ensures the production, transmission and use of knowledge in one or more specialized fields.

 License:
 Finance and Banks - accredited;
 Accounting and Management Informatics - accredited;
 Master:
 Finance Banks and Capital Markets - accredited;
 Banking and Insurance Financial Management - accredited;
 Management of the Financial-Accounting Information System - accredited;

References

External links 
ACCREDITATION Institutional Accreditation or Recognition Ministerul Educatiei si Cercetarii, România Other Specialized or Programmatic Accreditations Agentia Româna de Asigurare a Calitatii în Învatamântul Superior (ARACIS) Important: this section is intended to include only those reputable organizations (e.g. Ministries of Higher Education) that have the legal authority to officially recognize, accredit and/or license the Artifex University of Bucharest as a whole (institutional accreditation or recognition) or some of its specific courses/programs (programmatic accreditation). Memberships and affiliations to organizations which do not imply any formal, extensive and/or legal process of accreditation or recognition are included in the specific Affiliations and Memberships section below. Please report errors and inaccuracies taking into consideration the above criteria.

1992 establishments in Romania